Ernst Gottlieb Glück (about 1698, Marienburg (modern Alūksne), Livonia, Kingdom of Sweden — 14 (25) November 1767, Saint-Petersburg, Russian Empire) was a Russian statesman.

Biography 

He was born in Marienburg, now Alūksne in Latvia. His father, Johann Ernst Glück (1652—1705), was a German Lutheran theologian, pastor, teacher and also known for translating the Bible into the Latvian and Russian languages; his mother, Christian Emerentia von Reutern (?—1740), belonged to the Livonian nobility. As a child, he received his education at home. From 1716, he lived in Prussia and studied law at the University of Königsberg.

In 1725 by the order of Empress Catherine I he was employed as an assessor in the Justice Collegium of the Livonian and Estonian Affairs (it was renamed several times during his work): from 23 November 1739 — The Livonian and Estonian Affairs Collegium; from 8 February 1742 — The Justice Collegium of the Livonian and Estonian Affairs; from 15 December 1763 — The Justice Collegium of the Livonian, Estonian and Finnish Affairs.

The Justice Collegium of the Livonian and Estonian Affairs was in charge of all judicial institutions of the provinces attached in The Great Northern War of 1700—1721 but the highest court of appeal was the Senate (since 1762 the institutions of Vyborgskaya province belonged to the Justice Collegium of the Livonian and Estonian Affairs). The Collegium of the Livonian and Estonian Affairs did not have a founding document that is why its range of duties was not exactly defined. The Justice Collegium of the Livonian and Estonian Affairs was in charge of administrative affairs (the appointment of officials, the correspondence with imperial institutions): the court (processing of complaints on the wrong actions of the local administration and appeals against class courts` decisions and sentences); taxes (in 1739—1742); church problems of the Baltic population and Vyborgskaya province population, the Protestant Church in the Russian Empire (marriage, divorce, pastors` appointment and dismissal, disputes between the parishioners and the clergy, the maintenance of church service, establishing holidays). The peculiarity of the Collegium of the Livonian and Estonian Affairs was its activity guided by the local (mostly Swedish) legislation of the 15th — the beginning of 18th centuries and the church (canon) law but not the Russian (Imperial) legal system. The official language of the Collegium of the Livonian and Estonian Affairs was German. Ernst Gottlieb Glück as many officials of this Collegium, belonged to the Evangelical Lutheran Church.

In 1740, Ernst Gottlieb Glück was appointed the first councillor to the Justice Collegium of the Livonian and Estonian Affairs. In September 1741 he submitted an application to grant him and his descendants a diploma to the nobility and a coat of arms. He was given the coat of arms: “A gold winged ball; there was the Happiness or the Fortune on it”. The coat of arms and the diploma to the nobility had not been approved by Empress Elizabeth for the unknown reason that time.

Since 1754 some Russian researchers have called Ernst Gottlieb Glück the Vice-president of the Justice Collegium of the Livonian and Estonian Affairs. Baltisches Biographisches Lexikon doubts this fact. D. Raskin also called Emme F. the Vice-president of the Justice Collegium of the Livonian and Estonian Affairs in 1741—1764 and Klingstedt T. in  1764—1771 but did not  mention Ernst Gottlieb Glück. At first the authoritative genealogical reference by Aleksey Lobanov-Rostovsky "The Russian genealogy book"  called him the Vice-president of the Justice Collegium in its text, but it was another collegial authority, then the Vice-president of the Livonian and Estonian Affairs Justice Collegium and the actual state councilor in the changes and additions to the Volume 1.

In 1781, the Senate passed a resolution about Ernst Gottlieb Glück`s diploma to the nobility and his coat of arms: "15 March 1745 it is ordered to offer a diploma made by Glück for the signing of Her Majesty, when she will be in the Senate. And as the diploma is not used at present time, give it to the Archive”. By that time, Glück had been already dead for fourteen years.

Private life 
Ernst Gottlieb Glück was married twice. His first wife`s name is unknown. Then he married Charlotte Julia von Taube von ter Issen (18 April 1742). The children from the second marriage were Carl Friedrich (born 16 February 1754 and probably died that date), Eleanor (1764 — 27 May 1816, married to Christian Leopold von Vildeman, who was a great-nephew of Field Marshal Burkhard Christoph von Münnich (she was the third wife).

References 

1698 births
1767 deaths
Baltic-German people
18th-century Swedish people
18th-century people from the Russian Empire
Russian people of Dutch descent
Peter the Great